This is a comprehensive list of awards, honours and recognitions received by Mahathir Mohamad, the 4th and 7th Prime Minister of Malaysia.

Honours of Malaysia

Honours of Malaysia
  : 
 Grand Commander of the Order of the Defender of the Realm (SMN) – Tun (2003)
 :
 Grand Knight of the Order of the Territorial Crown (SUMW) – Datuk Seri Utama (2008)
 :
  Knight Grand Commander of the Order of the Crown of Johor (SPMJ) – Dato’ (1979)
 First Class of the Sultan Ibrahim Medal (PIS) (1985)
  First Class of the Royal Family Order of Johor (DK I) (1989)
 :
 Knight Grand Companion of the Order of Loyalty to the Royal House of Kedah (SSDK) – Dato’ Seri (1977)
  Member of the Kedah Supreme Order of Merit (DUK) (1988)
  Member of the Royal Family Order of Kedah (DK) (2003)
 :
  (2002, revoked 2018)
 :
  Knight Grand Commander of the Premier and Exalted Order of Malacca (DUNM) – Datuk Seri Utama (1982)
 :
 Knight Grand Commander of the Order of Loyalty to Negeri Sembilan (SPNS) – Dato’ Seri Utama (1981)
  Royal Family Order of Negeri Sembilan (DKNS) (1982)
 :
 Grand Knight of the Order of Sultan Ahmad Shah of Pahang (SSAP) – Dato’ Sri (1977)
 :
 Knight Grand Commander of the Order of the Defender of State (DUPN) – Dato’ Seri Utama (1981)
 :
 Grand Knight of the Order of Cura Si Manja Kini (SPCM) – Dato’ Seri (1981)
 :
 Member of the Perlis Family Order of the Gallant Prince Syed Putra Jamalullail (DK) (1995)
 :
 Grand Commander of the Order of Kinabalu (SPDK) – Datuk Seri Panglima (1981)
 :
 Knight Grand Commander of the Order of the Star of Hornbill Sarawak (DP) – Datuk Patinggi (1980)
  Knight Grand Commander of the Most Exalted Order of the Star of Sarawak (SBS) – Pehin Sri (2003)
 :
  (1978, returned 2017)
  (2003, returned 2017)
 :
 Member Grand Companion of the Order of Sultan Mahmud I of Terengganu (SSMT) – Dato' Seri (1982)

Foreign honours

 :
 Order of the Liberator General San Martín (1991)
 :
 Order of the Dragon of Bosnia (1996)
 :
 Royal Family Order of Brunei 1st Class (DK (Laila Utama)) - Dato Laila Utama (1997)
 :
 Grand Cross of the Order of Merit (1991)
 :
 Order of José Martí (1997)
 :
 Commander of the Order of the Great Star of Djibouti (1998)
 :
 Star of the Republic of Indonesia (1st Class) (1987)
 :
 Grand Cordon of the Order of the Rising Sun (1991)
  Grand Cordon of the Order of the Paulownia Flowers (2018)
 :
 Collar of the Order of Mubarak the Great (1997)
 :
 Grand Cordon of the Order of Merit (1997)
 :
 Grand Cross of the National Order of Mali (1984)
 :
 Grand Cross of the Order of the Aztec Eagle (1991)
 :
 Order of Pakistan (NPk) (2019)
 :
 Grand Cross of the Order of the Sun of Peru (1995)
 :
 Grand Cross of the Order of Merit of the Republic of Poland (2002)
 :
 Order of Friendship (2003)
 
  Grand Cross of the Order of Good Hope (1997)
 :
 Grand Gwanghwa Medal of the Order of Diplomatic Service Merit (1983)
 :
  Grand Cross of the Order of Civil Merit (24 March 1995)
 :
 Commander Grand Cross of the Order of the Polar Star (KmstkNO) (1996)
 : 
 Knight Grand Cordon (Special Class) of the Order of the White Elephant (KGE) (1981)
 :
 Order of the Republic (2019)

  Medal of the Oriental Republic of Uruguay (1996)
 :
 Order of the Liberator (1990)

Recognitions and accolades
 :
 Honorary citizenship of Tirana (1993)
 :
 Jawaharlal Nehru Award for International Understanding (1994)
 :
 Order of Great Leader (Nishan-e-Quaid-i-Azam) (1984)
 :
 King Faisal International Prize for Service to Islam (1997)
 :
 U Thant Peace Award (1999)

Honorary degrees
 
 :
 Honorary Ph.D. degree in Management and Engineering from University of Technology, Malaysia (2003)
 Honorary Litt.D. degree from International Islamic University Malaysia (2004)
 Honorary Ph.D. degree in Islamic Thoughts from University of Malaya (2004)
 Honorary Ph.D. degree in Engineering and Technology from PETRONAS University of Technology (2004)
 Honorary Ph.D. degree in Government and Political Science from MARA University of Technology (2004)
 Honorary Ph.D. degree in Knowledge Science from Multimedia University (2004)
 Honorary Ph.D. degree in Global Peace and National Reconciliation from Perdana University (2018)
 Honorary Doctor of Business Management from Asia School of Business (2019)
 :
 Honorary Ph.D. degree from Tsinghua University (2004)
 :
 Honorary Ph.D. degree in Literature from Al-Azhar University (1998)
 :
 Honorary Ph.D. degree from Meiji University (2001)
 Honorary Doctor of Laws from Keio University (2004)
 Honorary Ph.D. degree from Ritsumeikan Asia Pacific University (2018)
 Honorary Ph.D. degree from Tsukuba University (2018)
 Honorary Ph.D. degree from International University of Japan (2019)
 Honorary Doctor of Humane Letters from Doshisha University (2019)
 :
Honorary Ph.D. degree in Humanities from National University of Mongolia (1997)
:
Honorary Ph.D. degree from University of Santo Tomas (2012)
: 
 Honorary Ph.D. degree from Qatar University (2019)
 :
 Honorary Doctor of Laws from the National University of Singapore (2018)
 : 
 Honorary Ph.D. degree in Social Leadership, Business and Politics from Rangsit University (2018)
 :
 Honorary Ph.D. degree in Political Science and Public Administration from Yildirim Beyazit University (2019)

Others
 Time magazine named Mahathir as one of the 100 most influential people in the world in 2019.
Fortune magazine has ranked Mahathir the world’s 47th greatest leader.
 Guinness World Records: Mahathir was recognised as the world's oldest current prime minister in 2018, at the age of 92 years 141 days.

Places named after him
Several places were named after him, including:
 Kolej Tun Dr Mahathir, a residential college in Universiti Teknologi MARA (Machang Branch), Machang, Kelantan
 Kolej Kediaman Tun Dr. Mahathir (KKD), a residential college in Universiti Malaysia Perlis, Kuala Perlis, Perlis
 Institut Pemikiran Tun Dr Mahathir Mohamad, Universiti Utara Malaysia
 Jalan chedet.cc, his residence in Seri Kembangan, Selangor
 Rumah Kelahiran Tun Dr Mahathir, a museum birthplace of himself in Alor Setar, Kedah 
 Jalan Mahathir Mohamad in Kalitimbang, Cibeber, Cilegon City, Banten, Indonesia
 Mahathir Mohamad Road (شارع مهاتير محمد) in Mukallaf, Hadhramaut, Yemen

References

Mohamad, Mahathir